The Koetei-class was a class of three colonial schroefstoomschepen 4e klasse (gunboats) built by the Nederlandse Scheepsbouw Maatschappij in Amsterdam and Maatschappij voor Scheeps- en Werktuigbouw Fijenoord in Rotterdam for the Royal Netherlands Navy. The class comprised Koetei, Siboga and Assahan.

Description
The main armaments of the ship were two  single guns and one  gun. The ship had a complement of 97 men.

Construction

Service history
All ships were meant to serve in the Dutch East Indies.

Koetei
Koetei was laid down at the shipyard of the Nederlandse Scheepsbouw Maatschappij at Amsterdam and launched on 16 April 1898. During a fleet review on 15 September that year held on the Hollands Diep in honor of the coronation of the Dutch queen Wilhelmina of the Netherlands the ship left for the Dutch East Indies.
On 27 May 1900 Koetei pulled the Russian steamship Rossia loss. Rossia was stranded at Diamant Punt, Aceh while en route from Odessa to Vladivostok transporting grain and railroad equipment.
In 1931 she was moved to subsidiary duties.

Siboga 
Siboga was laid down at the shipyard of the Nederlandse Scheepsbouw Maatschappij at Amsterdam and launched on 28 April 1898. On 1 November that year she was commissioned in the Dutch navy. Later that year on 16 December the ship left for the Dutch East Indies where she arrived in Surabaya.
On 7 March 1899 the ship left Surabaya for the Siboga Expedition, which lasted till 26 February 1900.
In 1910 she was converted into a minelayer and sold in 1933.

Assahan 
Assahan was laid down at the shipyard of Maatschappij voor Scheeps- en Werktuigbouw Fijenoord at Rotterdam and launched in 1900. 26 October that year she was commissioned in the Dutch navy. The ship was to serve in the Dutch Indies Navy (Indische Militaire Marine).
In 1905 the ship took part in an expeditions to South Celebes. The expedition was undertaken against the lord of Boni.
In 1917 she was converted into a minelayer and sold in 1931.

Notes

References
Koloniaal verslag van 1901 (Bijlage C 5.5)

19th-century naval ships of the Netherlands
Gunboat classes